The Department of Corrections (Māori: Ara Poutama Aotearoa) is the public service department of New Zealand charged with managing the New Zealand corrections system. Corrections' role and functions were defined and clarified with the passing of the Corrections Act 2004. In early 2006, Corrections officially adopted the Māori name Ara Poutama Aotearoa.

History
The Department of Corrections was formed in 1995, by the Department of Justice (Restructuring) Act 1995. Prior to 1995 the country's prisons, probation system and the courts were all managed by the Department of Justice. This new act gave management of prisoners, parolees and offenders on probation to a new Department of Corrections while leaving administration of the court system and fines collection with the Ministry of Justice. The intention was to enable the new department to improve public safety and assist in the rehabilitation and reintegration of offenders.

In 2000, an approach based on enhanced computerised access to information about offenders was tried. The new chief executive of the department, Mark Byers, introduced a $40 million scheme designed to reduce reoffending called Integrated Offender Management System (IOMS). At the time it was described as "the biggest single initiative the department has undertaken to reduce reoffending". Seven years later, Greg Newbold said the scheme was an expensive failure and described it as "another wreck on the scrapheap of abandoned fads of criminal rehabilitation."

In 2012, Corrections Minister Anne Tolley and Associate Corrections Minister Pita Sharples announced the government would spend $65 million over the next four years, with the goal of reducing recidivism by 25 per cent by 2017.

Prison Privatisation
The use of private prisons has also been tried, stopped and reintroduced. New Zealand's first privately run prison, the Auckland Central Remand Prison, also known as Mt. Eden Prison, opened under contract to Australasian Correctional Management (ACM) in 2000. In 2004, the Labour government, opposed to privatisation, amended the law to prohibit the extension of private prison contracts. A year later, the 5-year contract with ACM was not renewed. In 2010, the National government again introduced private prisons and international conglomerate Serco was awarded the contract to run the Mt Eden Prison. Numerous scandals surrounding the Mt Eden Prison led to Serco's contract not being renewed there.

On 16 July 2015, footage of "fight clubs" within the prison emerged online and was reported by TVNZ. Serco was heavily criticized for not investigating until after the footage was screened. On 24 July 2015, Serco's contract to run the Mount Eden prison was revoked and operation was given back to the New Zealand Department of Corrections. Serco was ordered to pay $8 million to the New Zealand government as a result of problems at Mount Eden Prison while it was under Serco's management.

Serco has also been given the contract to build and manage a new 960-bed prison at Wiri. The contract with Serco provides stiff financial penalties if its rehabilitation programmes fail to reduce reoffending by 10% more than the Corrections Department programmes. The Auckland South Corrections Facility was opened on 8 May 2015. The contract to operate the prison ends in 2040.

Growth in Prison Population
Since it was established, the department has had to cope with a dramatic growth in the prison population. Between 1997 and 2011 the number of inmates increased by 70% and, at 201 prisoners per 100,000 of population (in 2018), New Zealand has one of the higher rates of imprisonment in the Western world. The Fifth Labour Government built four prisons – at Ngawha (Northern Region) housing 420 prisoners, Springhill (north of Huntly) housing 840, Auckland Women's' holding 330 and Milton (Otago) holding 425 – at a cost of $890 million. When National came to power in 2008, the department built a new 1,000 bed prison at Mt Eden for $218 million in a public private partnership and gave the contract to Serco.

The department's growth has been such that in July 2010, Finance Minister Bill English expressed concerns that government spending was "led by a rapidly expanding prison system which would soon make Corrections the government's biggest department". As at December 2011, New Zealand had 20 prisons and the department employed over 8,000 staff. The department's operating budget is over $1 billion a year.

As at 30 September 2019, there were 10,040 people in prison in New Zealand. However, the prison population is very fluid and altogether about 20,000 people spend time in prison each year, the vast majority on remand. Nearly 75% of those given a prison sentence are sentenced to two years or less, and all these are automatically released halfway through their sentence. As 30 September 2019, 93% percent of inmates were male. 51.9% of prisoners were Māori, compared with about 16% of New Zealand's resident population. The cost of keeping a person in prison for 12 months is $91,000. In 2001 the department estimated that a lifetime of offending by one person costs victims and taxpayers $3 million.

Despite English's concerns about the growing cost, in 2011 the government approved the building of a new 960-bed prison at Wiri estimated to cost nearly $400 million. Later that year justice sector forecasts showed a drop in the projected prison forecast for the first time. Charles Chauvel, Labour Party spokesperson for justice, and the Public Service Association both questioned the need for a new prison when there were 1,200 empty beds in the prison system. In March 2012, Corrections Minister Anne Tolley announced that the new prison would enable older prisons such as Mt Crawford in Wellington and the New Plymouth prison to be closed. Older units at Arohata, Rolleston, Tongariro/Rangipo and Waikeria prisons will also be shut down.

Rehabilitation policies
In 2012 the government announced that an extra $65 million would be put into rehabilitation, in an effort to reduce re-offending by 25% within five years. As part of the package, Corrections Minister Anne Tolley indicated the 14,000 offenders who spend time in prison on remand each year would become eligible for rehabilitation for the first time.

On 22 November 2019, it was reported that the Department of Corrections had adopted a policy of referring to prisoners as "men in our care" and "clients." Staff were also instructed to address prisoners by their first names instead of surnames. The Minister of Corrections Kelvin Davis confirmed that this was part of the Sixth Labour Government's Hōkai Rangi strategy to address the high rate of Māori reoffending and imprisonment by "humanising" prisoners. The government's decision was criticised by Corrections staff and the Leader of the Opposition Simon Bridges as "political correctness" and "being soft on crime."

Structure
The department comprises three service arms and four other groups. The service arms are prisons, community probation, and rehabilitation and reintegration and each arm used to have separate internal processes, infrastructure and support staff. As of May 2012 the newly appointed chief executive, Ray Smith proposed merging the three service arms into one team. Smith said the segregated infrastructure "creates replication of work, is inefficient and has resulted in an overly layered structure."
 Prison Services operates the Department's 19 prisons.
Juvenile youth justice residences: These are residences that are set across New Zealand for youth who have been sentenced by the youth court and for youth who are awaiting trial. There are a total of 4 of these centers on each region of New Zealand. Each person has their own room and have sharing spaces with other youth. These residences help youth with anger and drug problems and work toward teaching them right from wrong. They also help with job and school skills. Here are the 4 residences: · Korowai Manaaki · The Maioha o Parearangi · Te Au Rere a Tea Tonga · Te Puna Wai o Tuhinapo
 Community Probation Services manage approximately 100,000 community-based sentences and orders per year, and provide information and reports to judges and the New Zealand Parole Board to assist in reaching sentencing and release decisions. Staff also deliver interventions to offenders and prisoners to address their offending behaviour and prepare them for rejoining society.
 Rehabilitation and Reintegration Services delivers interventions to offenders and prisoners to address their offending behaviour. These involve employment, education, constructive activities, specialised treatment services and offence-focused programmes.
 Strategy, Policy and Planning provides strategic planning, policy development and advice, research and evaluation.
 Finance, Systems and Infrastructure provides a range of services that support the delivery of corrections' core business.
 Organisational Development provides strategic advice and day-to-day support and services to the Chief Executive and Corrections managers on structural and culture change, human resource management and development, employee health and safety, employee relations and employment law
 The Office of the Chief Executive manages key functions on behalf of the Chief Executive and incorporates Business Continuity and Emergency Planning, Corporate Affairs, Internal Audit, Inspectorate, Ministerial Secretariat, Portfolio Management Office, Professional Standards Unit and the Legal Services Team.

Chief executives
Mark Byers was chief executive of the Department of Corrections for its first ten years, until he retired from the public service in 2005. Byers oversaw a range of organisational initiatives in his time at the helm and, in 2000, introduced a new computer system called "Integrated Offender Management". At the time, this was described as "the biggest single initiative the Department has undertaken to reduce reoffending." IOMS cost $40 million but had no impact of the rate of re-conviction which remained at 55% two years after release.

Barry Matthews, who replaced Byers, had formerly been Deputy Commissioner of Police in New Zealand and the Commissioner of the Western Australian Police Force. He served as chief executive of Corrections for five years from 2005 to 2010 and, in a farewell interview, listed his top three achievements as the implementation of cell phone blocking technology in prisons, better enforcement by the Probation Service of sentence compliance, and the establishment of the Professional Standards Unit to investigate corruption by prison officers.

During Matthews' tenure there was public concern about the management of the department. Simon Power, opposition spokesman for justice from 2006 through to 2008, made a number of calls for an inquiry into Corrections, but none was held. In 2009 Matthews' leadership was questioned by the new Corrections Minister, Judith Collins, after a run of bad publicity that included the murder of 17-year-old Liam Ashley in a prison van; the murder of Karl Kuchenbecker by Graeme Burton six months after he was released on parole; and the Auditor General's critical report on the Probation Service's management of parolees. Matthews exacerbated speculation about his leadership during the Burton debacle when he claimed: "There's no blood on my hands". After the Auditor General's report was released in 2009, Collins refused to express confidence in Matthews and media commentators expected him to resign. However, Matthews refused to do so and served out his term; on his retirement he admitted he had dealt with so many crises, the department was like a "landmine".

Ray Smith, former deputy chief executive of Work and Income and former deputy chief executive of the Ministry of Social Development's Child, Youth and Family, was chief executive from 2010 to 2018.

Deputy Chief Executive Jeremy Lightfoot and National Commissioner Rachel Leota shared the acting Chief Executive role from November 2018 until February 2019 when Christine Stevenson, formerly Deputy Chief Executive at Corrections and newly appointed Comptroller of Customs and Chief Executive New Zealand Customs Service, was seconded back to lead the department from February to December 2019.

Jeremy Lightfoot was again Acting Chief Executive from December 2019 to February 2020 when he was permanently appointed as Chief Executive in February 2020.

Mental health and substance abuse in prison populations 
The New Zealand prison population experience higher mental health and substance abuse issues than the general population. For example, in 2015, about 90% of prisoners had been diagnosed with a mental health or substance abuse disorder during their lifetime. Female prisoners were more likely to be diagnosed with a mental health or substance abuse disorder than their male counterparts. All prisoners were three times more likely to be diagnosed with a mental health or substance abuse disorder than the general population within the last 12 months. 87% of the prison population had been diagnosed with at least one substance abuse disorder, including alcohol abuse and drug dependence. Common mental health diagnoses within the prison population included mood disorders (32%), personality disorders (about 33%), and comorbidity (42%). Prisoners were four times more likely to attempt suicide and twice as likely to experience suicidal ideation than the general population. All prisoners are screened for mental health and substance abuse disorders; those who meet specific criteria have options for treatment and intervention that can help with rehabilitation.

Violence in prisons 
In April 2015, a 44-year-old inmate, Benton Parata, died in Christchurch Men's Prison after being bashed by three other prisoners. An expert on gangs in New Zealand, Dr Jarrod Gilbert, said revenge attacks could "snowball" out of control while the prison officers' union said assaults in New Zealand prisons already occurred almost daily and it was only "good luck" there weren't more deaths.

Recidivism 
In March 2009 analysis of the previous 60 months, showed that 70% of prisoners reoffend within two years of being released from prison and 52% return to prison within five years (some of them more than once). For teenage prisoners, the recidivism rate (return to prison) is 71%. The government estimated that if it reached its reduced reoffending target of 25%, there would be 600 fewer people in prison by 2017. In 2014, prison numbers went up (to 8,700) rather than down, due to more offenders being held on remand.

See also
 List of correctional facilities in New Zealand
 Corrections Association of New Zealand
 New Zealand Parole Board
 New Zealand Probation Service
 Law enforcement in the Pitcairn Islands#Prison officers

References

External links
 

New Zealand Public Service departments
Law enforcement in New Zealand
Prison and correctional agencies
Penal system in New Zealand